Sergey Tkachenko (born 8 June 1999) is a Kazakhstani ski jumper. He competed in two events at the 2018 Winter Olympics.

Summer world record 
On 11 July 2018 at the opening event of Burabay Ski Jumps hill in Shchuchinsk, Kazakhstan he set the summer world record distance at 151 metres (495 ft), longest standing on plastic mate.

World Cup

Standings

Individual starts (29)

References

External links 

1999 births
Living people
Kazakhstani male ski jumpers
Olympic ski jumpers of Kazakhstan
Ski jumpers at the 2018 Winter Olympics
Ski jumpers at the 2022 Winter Olympics
Place of birth missing (living people)
Ski jumpers at the 2017 Asian Winter Games
Asian Games medalists in ski jumping
Medalists at the 2017 Asian Winter Games
Asian Games silver medalists for Kazakhstan
Asian Games bronze medalists for Kazakhstan
Ski jumpers at the 2016 Winter Youth Olympics
People from Ridder, Kazakhstan
Competitors at the 2023 Winter World University Games
Medalists at the 2023 Winter World University Games
Universiade medalists in nordic combined
Universiade silver medalists for Kazakhstan